Mount Reimer is a mountain, 2,430 m, in the northern portion of the Sentinel Range, standing on the south side of Newcomer Glacier 5 mi southwest of Mount Warren. It surmounts Skaklya Glacier to the southeast and Vidul Glacier to the north-northwest.

The mountain was named by US-ACAN for John D. Reimer of U.S. Navy Squadron VX-6, aerial photographer on flights over this range on Dec. 14–15, 1959.

See also
 Mountains in Antarctica

Maps
 Newcomer Glacier.  Scale 1:250 000 topographic map.  Reston, Virginia: US Geological Survey, 1961.
 Antarctic Digital Database (ADD). Scale 1:250000 topographic map of Antarctica. Scientific Committee on Antarctic Research (SCAR). Since 1993, regularly updated.

References

Ellsworth Mountains
Mountains of Ellsworth Land